A total lunar eclipse will take place on August 18, 2054.

Visibility 

The entire eclipse will be visible in western North America and the Pacific Ocean. Part or most of the eclipse will be visible in the remainder of the Americas,  Oceania, and most of Eastern and Southeastern Asia.

Related lunar eclipses

Saros series 

It last occurred on August 7, 2036 and will next occur on August 28, 2072.

This is the 40th member of Lunar Saros 129. The previous event was the August 2036 lunar eclipse. The next event is the August 2072 lunar eclipse. Lunar Saros 129 contains 11 total lunar eclipses between 1910 and 2090. Solar Saros 136 interleaves with this lunar saros with an event occurring every 9 years 5 days alternating between each saros series.

Half-Saros cycle
A lunar eclipse will be preceded and followed by solar eclipses by 9 years and 5.5 days (a half saros). This lunar eclipse is related to two total solar eclipses of Solar Saros 136.

Lunar year series

See also 
List of lunar eclipses and List of 21st-century lunar eclipses

Notes

External links 
 

2054-08
2054-08
2054 in science